Muchachos impacientes is a 1966 Argentine film directed by Julio Saraceni.

Cast
 Susy Monet as Simonette
 Ringo Bonavena as himself			
 Kitty Johnson as Emily Cranz 
 Polo Márquez as Raúl Lavié 	
 Marcos Méndez as Marco Antonio Muñiz 		
 Néstor Duval as Juan Ramón

External links
 

1966 films
Argentine musical comedy films
1960s Spanish-language films
Films directed by Julio Saraceni
1960s Argentine films